East of Eden is a 2008 South Korean television series, starring Song Seung-heon, Yeon Jung-hoon, Lee Da-hae, Han Ji-hye, Park Hae-jin and Lee Yeon-hee. It was produced by Chorokbaem Media as a 47th Anniversary Special Project Drama for MBC, on which it aired from August 25, 2008 to March 10, 2009 on Mondays and Tuesdays at 21:55 for 56 episodes. The  drama tells the story of the brothers Dong-chul (Song) and Dong-wook (Yeon). Their fates diverge after the murder of their coal miner father, with one joining the mob and the other becoming a successful lawyer.

Plot
A period epic that spans the years 1960 to 2000s, East of Eden tells a saga of the bitter rivalry between two men who are eternally bound by fate. Historic events are referenced, such as the rapid industrialization of the 1970s and 1980s, Taebaek coal miners' strikes and student-led democracy movements.

Shin Tae-hwan (Jo Min-ki) is the managing director of a coal mine in Taebaek. The true embodiment of ruthless ambition, he strives to inherit the coal mining company Taesung Group. In the process, he kills Lee Ki-chul (Lee Jong-won), a miner crusading for worker's rights who has been blocking his path to success. He also seduces Yoo Mi-ae (Shin Eun-jung), a nurse at Taebaek Hospital, only to coldly brush her away after he's tired of her.

At the same moment that Yang Chun-hee (Lee Mi-sook), wife of the deceased Ki-chul, is giving birth to a son at Taebaek Hospital, Shin Tae-hwan's wife also gives birth to a baby boy. Filled with rage at Shin Tae-hwan's betrayal, the nurse Mi-ae comes up with a scheme to fulfill her own revenge. She switches the two babies. By doing so, she viciously transforms the fates of not just two lives, but those around them.

Years later, Chun-hee's sons Lee Dong-chul (Song Seung-heon) and Lee Dong-wook (Yeon Jung-hoon) have taken different paths in life. To alleviate their poverty, Dong-chul becomes a gangster, while the younger Dong-wook dreams of becoming a prosecutor to avenge his family by using the law against Shin Tae-hwan. Two women enter Dong-chul's life: the smart and sensible Min Hye-rin (Lee Da-hae), and Gook Young-ran (Lee Yeon-hee), the willful daughter of his gang boss (Yoo Dong-geun). Meanwhile, Shin Myung-hoon (Park Hae-jin), who's been molded in his father Tae-hwan's spiteful, selfish image, sets his eye on Kim Ji-hyun (Han Ji-hye), Dong-wook's sweetheart.

Although Dong-chul is on the other side of the law, he remains protective of Dong-wook, but a revelation shakes him to his core: that his nemesis Shin Myung-hoon is actually his biological brother while the beloved brother that had been beside him all these years is actually the biological son of his enemy.

Cast

Main characters
Song Seung-heon as Lee Dong-chul
Shin Dong-woo as Dong-chul (5 years old)
Kim Bum as Dong-chul (15 years old)
Yeon Jung-hoon as Lee Dong-wook
Park Gun-woo as Dong-wook (10 years old)
Lee Da-hae as Min Hye-rin
Han Ji-hye as Kim Ji-hyun
Nam Ji-hyun as Ji-hyun (10 years old)
Park Hae-jin as Shin Myung-hoon
Won Deok-hyun as Myung-hoon (10 years old)
Lee Yeon-hee as Gook Young-ran / Grace
Jo Min-ki as Shin Tae-hwan (Myung-hoon's father)
Lee Mi-sook as Yang Chun-hee (Dong-chul and Dong-wook's mother)
Yoo Dong-geun as Gook Dae-hwa (Young-ran's father)

Supporting characters
Dennis Oh as Mike Packard (Young-ran's fiancé)
Lee Jong-won as Lee Ki-chul (Dong-chul and Dong-wook's father)
Jeon Mi-seon as Jung-ja (Ki-soon's mother)
Park Hyun-sook as Yang Ok-hee (Chun-hee's sister)
Jeon So-min as Lee Ki-soon
Jin Ji-hee as Ki-soon (9 years old)
Kim Sung-kyum as resident Oh
Na Hyeon-hui as Oh Yoon-hee
Lee Won-jae as Kyung-tae
Shim Hye-jin as Young-ran's mother
Yoon Dong-hwan as lawyer Kim Tae-seon
Jung Hye-young as Janice / Jae-hee
Shin Eun-jung as Yoo Mi-ae / Rebecca
Hwang Jung-eum as Kim So-jung
Kang Eun-tak as Han Soo-jae
Jeon Sung-hwan as stationmaster Kim Gab-soo (Ji-hyun's grandfather)
Lee Seok-joon as Father Han
Kim Hyung-min as Wang-geon
Go Yoon-hoo as Dok-sa
Park Chan-hwan as Uncle Chang
Kim Hak-chul as Kang Gi-man
Park Geun-hyung as President Min (Hye-rin's father)
Jung Young-sook as Bae Hwa-mi (Mr. Min's wife)
Jung So-young as Min Hye-ryung (Hye-rin's sister)
Park Sung-woong as Baek Sung-hyun
Lee Sol-gu as Choi Hak-sung
Jung Yoon-seok as Yo-seob

Awards and nominations

References

External links
  official MBC website 
  at MBC Global Media
 
 

MBC TV television dramas
2008 South Korean television series debuts
2009 South Korean television series endings
Television series set in 1960
Television series set in the 2000s
Television series about revenge
Television series by Chorokbaem Media
Korean-language television shows
South Korean melodrama television series
South Korean action television series